Nick Weiss (born August 16, 1992) is a  professional lacrosse player for the Buffalo Bandits of the National Lacrosse League and the Peterborough Lakers of Major Series Lacrosse. Hailing from Port Hope, Ontario, Weiss began his career with the Peterborough Junior Lakers of the Ontario Junior A Lacrosse League, with whom he played from 2010 to 2013, before being called up to the MSL Lakers in 2014.

Weiss was drafted in the second round of the 2013 NLL Entry Draft by the Vancouver Stealth, and played in fifteen games in his rookie year. He was dealt, along with some draft picks, to the Buffalo Bandits in exchange for defenseman Rory Smith and goaltender Eric Penney, as well as a first round pick in the 2014 Draft.

Weiss has also played junior hockey in a variety of leagues. He ended his Junior hockey career with the Port Hope Panthers in the Ontario Hockey Association in the Empire B Junior C Hockey League.

Weiss is also an avid hunter and fisherman in Central Ontario.

References

External links

Nick Weiss's NLL stats at pointstreak.com
Nick Weiss's MSL stats at pointstreak.com
Nick Weiss's OLA stats at pointstreak.com

1992 births
Living people
Lacrosse people from Ontario
Buffalo Bandits players
Vancouver Warriors players
Ice hockey people from Ontario
Estevan Bruins (SJHL) players
Grande Prairie Storm players
Ontario Junior Hockey League players